The Alor–Pantar languages are a family of clearly related Papuan languages spoken on islands of the Alor archipelago near Timor in southern Indonesia. They may be most closely related to the Papuan languages of eastern Timor, but this is not yet clear. A more distant relationship with the Trans–New Guinea languages of the Bomberai peninsula of Western New Guinea has been proposed based on pronominal evidence, but though often cited has never been firmly established.

Languages
The family is conventionally divided into two branches, centered on the islands of Alor and Pantar.

 Alor branch: Wosika, Abui, Adang–Kabola, Kafoa (Jafoo), Kui, Klon, Wersing, Sawila, Kula
 Pantar branch: Blagar, Teiwa, Kaera, Lamma, Nedebang, Retta

Tereweng is sometimes considered a separate language from Blagar, Hamap sometimes separate from Adang, and Sar sometimes from Teiwa. Abui, Kamang, and Kabola may also not be unitary languages. There is a total of 71,940 speakers.

External classification
It has long been recognized that the Papuan languages of the Alor archipelago (including Alor and Pantar, as well as the four small islands of Buaya, Pura, Ternate, and Tereweng in the Pantar Strait) form a well-defined group. Apparent cognates among basic vocabulary are abundant, as demonstrated for example in Stokhof’s (1975) survey of basic vocabulary, and the shape of pronominal systems is almost identical across the group. The genetic relatedness of the Alor–Pantar languages has been confirmed through the reconstruction of the proto-Alor–Pantar language. Relationships between the Alor–Pantar languages and at least some (though perhaps not all) of the non-Austronesian languages of Timor Island may justify the positing of a Timor–Alor–Pantar language family, however, the relationship between the AP group and the Timor languages is of second order.

Wurm et al. (1975) classified the AP languages as members of the putative Trans-New Guinea Phylum. However, the authors offered little evidence for this classification and remained somewhat doubtful, noting, “whichever way they [the Timor–Alor–Pantar languages] are classified, they contain strong substratum elements of the other … phyla involved” (Wurm et al. 1975:318).

Most recently, based on an analysis of pronominal shapes Ross (2005) assigns AP to his West Trans-New Guinea linkage, a subgroup of Trans-New Guinea. Yet Ross’ proposal requires that AP pronouns be derived from pTNG via a flip-flop in which second-person pronouns trade places with the third person. Compare pTNG *ŋga ‘2pro’ and *(y)a ‘3pro’ with Nedebang aŋ and gaŋ, respectively. Bottom-up reconstruction based on regular sound correspondences may shed further light on these issues.

Internal classification

Holton, et al. (2012)
Holton, et al. (2012) propose the following classificatory subgrouping for the Alor–Pantar languages, with individual languages marked by italics.

Proto-Alor–Pantar
Teiwa
Nedebang
Kaera
Western Pantar (Mauta, Tubbe, Lamma)
Alor (*k, *q merge)
Kui
Abui
Kamang
?Kafoa (Jafoo)
West Alor (*s > )
Klon
Straits (*k > Ø, *g > )
Blagar–Retta
Blagar
Retta
Adang
East Alor (*b > , *s > )
Tanglapui
Sawila
Kula
Wersing (Kolana)

"Proto-Alor–Pantar" may be synonymous with Proto-Timor–Alor–Pantar, as the languages outside the Alor branch do not seem to form a valid node with it against the Oirata–Makasai languages of East Timor and Bunak language on the Timorese border. However, the relationship is distant.

Kaiping and Klamer (2019)
A 2019 phylogenetic study of Alor-Pantar by Kaiping and Klamer gives the following internal structure:

Alor-Pantar
East Alor
Kamang
Wersing; Sawila-Kula
Nuclear Alor-Pantar
Alor
Central Alor
Klon
Abui-Kafoa; Kiriman-Kui
West Alor
Kabola; Adang-Lawahing
Hamap; Adang-Otvai
Pantar-Straits
Western Pantar
Pantar
Klamu, Teiwa
Kaera; Reta-Blagar

Kaiping and Klamer (2019b) have found that the four major Alor–Pantar subgroups, namely Pantar, Blagar, Central Alor, and East Alor, form different phylogenetic trees depending on the methodology that is applied.

Pronouns
Ross (2005) postulates a "West Timor" group uniting Alor–Pantar with Bunak.  He reconstructs the pronouns as:

{|
|+
! !!sg!!pl
|-
!1ex
|rowspan=2|*na||*ni
|-
!1in
|*pi
|-
!2
|*[y]a||*i
|-
!3
|*ga||*gi
|}

3pl *gi is not attested from Bunak, and the inclusive is just i.

Language documentation
Language documentation efforts in the early 21st century have produced a range of published documentary materials.
Grammatical descriptions
A Grammar of Adang (Haan 2001)
A Grammar of Abui (Kratochvíl 2007)
A Grammar of Klon (Baird 2008)
A Grammar of Teiwa (Klamer 2010)
Dictionaries
Kamus Pengantar Bahasa Abui (Kratochvíl & Delpada 2008)
Kamus Pengantar Bahasa Pantar Barat (Holton & Lamma Koly 2008)

Proto-language

A reconstruction of proto-Alor–Pantar has been proposed by Holton and Robinson (2017).

Proto-Alor–Pantar consonants are:

{| 
| p || t ||  || k || q
|-
| b || d ||  || g || 
|-
| m || n ||  ||  || 
|-
|  || s ||  ||  || 
|-
| w ||  || j ||  || 
|-
|  || l (r) ||  ||  || 
|}

In contrast, proto-Timor-Alor-Pantar does not have the voiceless uvular stop /q/.

Lexical reconstructions by Holton and Robinson (2017) are:

proto-Alor–Pantar reconstructions (Holton and Robinson 2017)

{| class="wikitable sortable"
! gloss !! proto-Alor-Pantar
|-
| ‘bird’ || *(a)dVl
|-
| ‘name’ || *en(i,u)
|-
| ‘thatch’ || *aman
|-
| ‘black’ || *aqana
|-
| ‘vagina’ || *-ar
|-
| ‘two’ || *araqu
|-
| ‘bite’ || *-asi
|-
| ‘crocodile’ || *bagai
|-
| ‘yellow’ || *bagori
|-
| ‘pig’ || *baj
|-
| ‘leg’ || *-bat
|-
| ‘mat’ || *bis
|-
| ‘wave’ || *bob
|-
| ‘betel nut’ || *bui
|-
| ‘guard’ || *bukan
|-
| ‘smoke’ || *bunaq
|-
| ‘sing’ || *dar(a)
|-
| ‘slippery’ || *dul(a)
|-
| ‘thick’ || *dumV
|-
| ‘rat’ || *dur
|-
| ‘burn’ || *ede
|-
| ‘give’ || *-ena
|-
| ‘3sg’ || *ga-
|-
| ‘3gen’ || *ge-
|-
| ‘3pl’ || *gi-
|-
| ‘2sg’ || *ha-
|-
| ‘fish’ || *habi
|-
| ‘village’ || *haban
|-
| ‘fire, firewood’ || *hada
|-
| ‘yawn’ || *hagur
|-
| ‘breast’ || *hami
|-
| ‘excrement’ || *has
|-
| ‘empty’ || *hasak
|-
| ‘lime’ || *hawar
|-
| ‘dream’ || *hipar
|-
| ‘sugarcane’ || *huːba
|-
| ‘fruit’ || *is(i)
|-
| ‘laugh’ || *jari
|-
| ‘bad, broken’ || *jasi
|-
| ‘star’ || *jibV
|-
| ‘dog’ || *jibar
|-
| ‘water’ || *jira
|-
| ‘fly’ (v.) || *jira(n)
|-
| ‘five’ || *jiwesin
|-
| ‘mosquito’ || *kin
|-
| ‘fingernail’ || *kusin
|-
| ‘flea’ || *kVt
|-
| ‘walk’ || *lam(ar)
|-
| ‘tongue’ || *-lebur
|-
| ‘far’ || *lete
|-
| ‘crouch’ || *luk(V)
|-
| ‘bark’ (v.) || *lVu
|-
| ‘bat’ || *madel
|-
| ‘hear’ || *magi
|-
| ‘come’ || *mai
|-
| ‘betel vine’ || *mait
|-
| ‘father’ || *-mam
|-
| ‘bamboo’ || *mari
|-
| ‘(be) in/on’ || *mi
|-
| ‘climb’ || *mid
|-
| ‘nose’ || *-mim
|-
| ‘die’ || *min(a)
|-
| ‘sit’ || *mis
|-
| ‘banana’ || *mogol
|-
| ‘body hair’ || *mudi
|-
| ‘plant’ (v.) || *mudin
|-
| ‘horn’ || *-muk
|-
| ‘rotten’ || *mVn
|-
| ‘1sg’ || *na-
|-
| ‘eat/drink’ || *nai
|-
| ‘sibling (older)’ || *nan(a)
|-
| ‘one’ || *nuk
|-
| ‘throw’ || *oda
|-
| ‘tail’ || *-ora
|-
| ‘dry in sun’ || *por
|-
| ‘hold’ || *p{i,u}nV
|-
| ‘1pl.incl’ || *pi-
|-
| ‘spit’ || *purVn
|-
| ‘scorpion’ || *pVr
|-
| ‘goanna’ || *rVsi
|-
| ‘spear’ || *qaba(k)
|-
| ‘tens’ || *qar-
|-
| ‘new’ || *siba
|-
| ‘shark’ || *sib(a,i)r
|-
| ‘six’ || *talam
|-
| ‘saltwater’ || *tam
|-
| ‘fat’ || *tama
|-
| ‘hand/arm’ || *-tan
|-
| ‘pierce’ || *tapai
|-
| ‘stand’ || *tas
|-
| ‘tree’ || *tei
|-
| ‘bedbug’ || *temek
|-
| ‘ripe’ || *tena
|-
| ‘wake s.o.’ || *-ten
|-
| ‘recline’ || *tia
|-
| ‘expel’ || *tiara
|-
| ‘close’ (v.) || *-tiari(n)
|-
| ‘stomach’ || *-tok
|-
| ‘short’ || *tukV
|-
| ‘child’ || *-uaqal
|-
| ‘ear’ || *-uari
|-
| ‘tooth’ || *uasin
|-
| ‘knee’ || *uku
|-
| ‘mouth’ || *-wa
|-
| ‘sun’ || *wadi
|-
| ‘blood’ || *wai
|-
| ‘roof’ || *wai
|-
| ‘stone’ || *war
|-
| ‘coconut’ || *wata
|-
| ‘bathe’ || *weli
|-
| ‘moon’ || *wur
|}

Further reading
Robert Forkel, Simon J Greenhill, & Tiago Tresoldi. (2019). lexibank/robinsonap: Internal Classification of the Alor-Pantar Language Family (Version v3.0) [Data set]. Zenodo.

References

External links

Alor and Pantar Languages: Origins and Theoretical Impacts
Alor–Pantar languages: origins and theoretical impact – University of Leiden
Linguistic Variation in Eastern Indonesia: the Alor and Pantar Project – University of Leiden
 The Alor Pantar Languages. Edited by Marian Klamer. Language Science Press. 485pp. Free download.

 
Timor–Alor–Pantar languages
Languages of Indonesia